Henry Lascelles, 2nd Earl of Harewood DL (25 December 1767 – 24 November 1841), known as Viscount Lascelles from 1814 to 1820, was a British peer, slave plantation and other land owner, chiefly inherited art collector, and Member of Parliament.

Early life and politics
Harewood was the second son of Edward Lascelles, 1st Earl of Harewood, and Anne Chaloner. He was elected to the House of Commons for Yorkshire in 1796, a seat he held until the 1807 Yorkshire election and again from 1812 to 1818, and also represented Westbury from 1807 to 1812 and Northallerton from 1818 to 1820. The latter year he succeeded his father in the earldom and entered the House of Lords. Between 1819 and 1841 he also served as Lord Lieutenant of the West Riding of Yorkshire.

According to the Legacies of British Slave-Ownership at the University College London, Harewood was awarded a payment as a slave trader in the aftermath of the Slavery Abolition Act 1833 with the Slave Compensation Act 1837. The British Government took out a £15 million loan (worth £ in ) with interest from Nathan Mayer Rothschild and Moses Montefiore which was subsequently paid off by the British taxpayers (ending in 2015). Harewood was associated with six different claims, he owned 1277 slaves in Barbados and Jamaica and received a £26,307 payment at the time (worth £ in ).

Marriage and issue
Lord Harewood married Henrietta Sebright (d. 15 February 1840), daughter of Sir John Sebright, 6th Baronet, on 3 September 1794. They had eleven children:

Edward Lascelles, Viscount Lascelles (18 Jul 1796 – 7 Dec 1839), married (1) Ann Elizabeth Rosser, (2) Philippine Munster and died without issue.
Henry Lascelles, 3rd Earl of Harewood (11 Jun 1797 – 22 Feb 1857)
William Saunders Sebright Lascelles (29 Oct 1798 – 2 Jul 1851)
Edwin Lascelles (1799 – 25 Apr 1865), died unmarried.
Francis Lascelles (12 Feb 1801 – 2 Feb 1814)
Lady Harriet Lascelles (19 Jun 1802 – 1 Jan 1889), married George Holroyd, 2nd Earl of Sheffield, and had issue.
Frederick Lascelles (1803 – 13 Oct 1823)
Lady Frances Anne Lascelles ( 2 Jun 1804 – 7 Dec 1855), married John Thomas Hope, son of General Sir Alexander Hope and had issue.
Arthur Lascelles (23 Jan 1807 – 19 Jul 1880), married Caroline Frances Brooke, daughter of Richard Brooke, 6th Baronet and had issue.
Lady Emma Lascelles (16 Mar 1809 – 8 Feb 1865), married Edward Portman, 1st Viscount Portman and had issue.
Lady Louisa Lascelles (10 Sep 1812 – 10 Mar 1886), married Lord George Henry Cavendish, younger brother of William Cavendish, 7th Duke of Devonshire, and had issue.

His wife is mentioned in Mansfield Park, by Jane Austen, in a letter from Mary Crawford to Fanny Price while Fanny is staying with her mother and father in Portsmouth: "I was there, two years ago, when Lady Lascelles had it, and I prefer it over any other house in London." (She is talking about a house in Wimpole Street.)

Notes

References

Kidd, Charles, Williamson, David (editors). Debrett's Peerage and Baronetage (1990 edition). New York: St Martin's Press, 1990,

External links 
 

1767 births
1841 deaths
Lord-Lieutenants of the West Riding of Yorkshire
Lascelles, Henry Lascelles, Viscount
British MPs 1796–1800
Lascelles, Henry Lascelles, Viscount
Tory MPs (pre-1834)
Lascelles, Henry Lascelles, Viscount
Lascelles, Henry Lascelles, Viscount
Lascelles, Henry Lascelles, Viscount
Lascelles, Henry Lascelles, Viscount
Lascelles, Henry Lascelles, Viscount
Lascelles, Henry Lascelles, Viscount
UK MPs who inherited peerages
Henry
2
British slave owners
Recipients of payments from the Slavery Abolition Act 1833